Naked as Nature Intended (released in the United States under the title As Nature Intended) is a 1961 British nudist film produced and directed by George Harrison Marks and starring Pamela Green. It was the first film from producers Tony Tenser and Michael Klinger.

It was also known during production as Cornish Holiday.

The scenes in the nudist camp were filmed at Spielplatz in Hertfordshire.

In 2013 the illustrated book Naked as Nature Intended: The Epic Tale of a Nudist Picture by Pamela Green was released. The pictures in the book were by the film's stills photographer, "Dam Buster" Douglas Webb.

Plot
Three young women (Pam, Petrina and Jacky) hire a car and embark on a motoring holiday of the English countryside. They meet up with two young women (Bridget and Angela) who are garage attendants and who decide to take a hiking holiday. Much of the film's running time is spent in travelogue through Somerset, Devon and Cornwall, visiting locations such as Stonehenge, Tintagel, Clovelly, the Minack Open Air Theatre, Bedruthan Steps and Land's End. The women all end up at a nudist camp at Land's End and, once there, Angela and Bridget (who are nudists) persuade the others to remove their clothes and lose their inhibitions.

Cast
 Pamela Green as Pamela
 Jackie Salt as Jackie
 Petrina Forsyth as Petrina
 Bridget Leonard as Bridget
 Angela Jones as Angela

Production

Tony Tenser and Michael Klinger were distributors of imported films and owners of the Compton Cinema Club in Soho, London's first sex cinema. They wanted to produce a nudist feature film and approached Marks about making one. The only way that the British Board of Film Censors (BBFC) would allow nudity in film at that time was for the film to focus on the naturist movement. Films about nudist camps were considered to be discreet enough to pass the censorship requirements but would still attract audiences. Marks met John Trevelyan, secretary of the BBFC, before shooting commenced. No script had been written at the time of the meeting, but the film was sanctioned by the founder of the British Naturism Movement, who owned the Spielplatz Sun Camp where some scenes were to be filmed. Trevelyan raised no objections to the film. Once the film had been produced, the shower scene from the opening sequence was cut from the British release by the BBFC, and the film received an A certificate. The cut was made due to the assumption that viewers would infer that Pamela and her flat mate were lesbians.

Release

Tenser's marketing campaign for the film billed it as "the greatest nudist film ever". The campaign made use of the fame that Marks and Green had acquired by this time, billing Green as the "Queen of the Pin-Ups" and Marks as the "King of the Camera". The film opened in November 1961 at the Cameo Moulin cinema in Windmill Street to poor reviews. It was, however, popular with audiences, creating queues for entry when it opened. The film ran in cinemas in the West End of London for two years. It was released in the United States as As Nature Intended because the word Naked was considered too risqué for the American public. Nevertheless, the cut scene remained in the American release of the film.

The film was released on video in 1999.

References

Further reading
Naked as Nature Intended: The Epic Tale of a Nudist Picture. Suffolk & Watt, 2013,  .

External links

1961 films
Crown International Pictures films
British exploitation films
1960s exploitation films
Films directed by Harrison Marks
1961 directorial debut films
Nudity in film
1960s English-language films
1960s British films